Kaiser Wilhelm II Land is a part of Antarctica lying between Cape Penck at 87° 43'E and Cape Filchner at 91° 54'E. Princess Elizabeth Land is located to the west, and Queen Mary Land to the east. The area is claimed by Australia as part of the Australian Antarctic Territory, but like other territorial claims in Antarctica this is not universally recognized.

Exploration
The area was discovered on 22 February 1902, during the Gauss expedition of 1901–1903 led by Arctic veteran and geologist Erich von Drygalski. Drygalski named it after the sitting Kaiser Wilhelm II who had funded the expedition with 1.2 million Goldmarks. The expedition also discovered the Gaussberg, a  extinct volcano, which was named after mathematician and physicist Carl Friedrich Gauss.

References

 
Australian Antarctic Territory
Geography of Antarctica
Lands of Antarctica